The krogharpe was a type of harp native to Norway, which featured steel strings and a horizontal soundboard. In the modern era German harpist Nancy Thym has reconstructed and played a krogharpe based on an instrument built in 1776 in Østerdalen.

Period description
A 1916 article in The Musical Times described the instrument:

A 1902 German-language encyclopedia described it as "played until recently."

Further reading
The Norwegian Krogharpe: an attempt to reconstruct a lost playing technique, Nancy Thym

References

Harps
Norwegian musical instruments
Reconstructed musical instruments